Birds

Birds described in 1850 include bee hummingbird, Wilson's bird-of-paradise,  blue swallow, blue-shouldered robin-chat, Bornean banded pitta, Cape white-eye, grey-collared oriole, long-billed crow, 
purple-bearded bee-eater, Shoebill
Extinction of the spectacled cormorant
Edward Smith-Stanley obtains a grey trembler specimen from the  bird collector Jules Verreaux

People
 Death of Henri Marie Ducrotay de Blainville

Publications
John Gould commences The Birds of Asia (1850–83)
Francis Orpen Morris  begins  A History of British Birds  (1850–1857)
Frédéric de Lafresnaye 1850. Essai d'une monographie du genre Picule (Buffon), Dendrocolaptes (Hermann, Illiger), devenu aujourd'hui la sous-famille Dendrocolaptinæ (Gray, Genera of birds), de la famille de Certhiadæ de Swains. Revue et Magasin de Zoologie Pure et Appliquée  online BHL

Ongoing events
Fauna Japonica

Institutions
Deutsche Ornithologen-Gesellschaft founded
 The Berlin Museum has a total of 13,760 bird specimens

Birding and ornithology by year
1850 in science